This is a list of programs currently, formerly, and soon to be broadcast on TVes in Venezuela.

Current programming

Telenovelas 
Cordel Encantado (March 9, 2015 – present)
Guerreras y Centauros (February 23, 2015 – present) 
Lado a Lado (2014–present)
Porque el amor manda (August 4, 2014 – present)
Una familia con suerte (April 13, 2015 – present)
Violetta (August 4, 2014 – present)

Children's programming 
Casper the Friendly Ghost (2014–present)
El Chapulín Colorado (2015–present)
Como tú (2011–present)
Pet Alien (2014–present)
Plaza Sésamo (2010-present) 
 Hi-5 Australia  (2011-present)
 Hi-5 Fiesta
 Hi-5 House (2017-present)
The Backyardigans

Lifestyle programming 
Conexión Yoga (2012–present)
Salud al natural (2013–present)

Sports and variety programming 
Con El Mazo Dando (2014–present)
Motores en vivo (2013–present)
Notables: Mateo Manaure (2014–present)
TVes en la mañana (2014–present)
Venezuela sobre tablas (2014–present)

Upcoming 
El Moreno Michael (coming soon)

Former programming

References

External links
Official website

Tves
 
Programs